Lea Green railway station is in St Helens, Merseyside, England, three miles south of the town centre near the suburb of Clock Face. Northern Trains operates the station with Merseytravel sponsorship displaying Merseytravel signs. Constructed in 2000, the station has a park and ride car park fitted with charging points for electrically-powered vehicles, a modern CCTV security system and a booking office at street level.

History
The first Lea Green station was where Lowfield Lane met Lea Green Road (SJ510920 about 950 metres towards Liverpool from the current station) It opened in 1830 on the Liverpool and Manchester Railway.  The early intermediate stations were little more than halts positioned where the railway crossed a road or turnpike accounting for variations in their names. Lea Green station was probably known as Top of Sutton Incline, then Sutton by 1844, and Lea Green again in 1848, although Butt (1995) says it was Lea Green before becoming Sutton. The first station closed on 7 March 1955.

The current station in the cutting at Marshalls Cross opened on 17 September 2000.

Thatto Heath railway station on the Liverpool to Wigan Line is approximately two miles to the north west.

Facilities
The ticket office is staffed each day from 06:00 to midnight (except Sundays, when it opens at 08:30).  Shelters are provided on each platform, along with help points, digital information screens and timetable poster boards. Both platforms have step-free access from the ticket office and station entrance via ramps.

Services
Northern Trains operates trains (every 30 minutes Monday-Saturday daytime) to Liverpool Lime Street. Northern services to Manchester Victoria run during the weekday peaks and early morning/late evening. A single train each day runs to and from  via Earlestown.

Sunday services see just one train per hour to Liverpool Lime Street and  via Manchester Airport. When the line was electrified in spring 2015, Liverpool to Manchester Airport, Liverpool to Manchester Victoria and Liverpool to Warrington Bank Quay services were operated by four-car Class 319 electric units, but three-car Class 323 units now also appear regularly.

As of the May 2018 timetable change, TransPennine Express began to call here, with hourly services to Leeds, York or Scarborough via Manchester Victoria eastbound and express to Lime Street westbound.  These remain in operation in the summer 2019 timetable. These use a mixture of different rolling stock, including the new Class 68-powered push-pull sets and Class 185 DMUs. In addition to this, TPE have 1 service a day from Glasgow Central - Liverpool Lime Street that calls here. There is no return in the opposite direction.

Future 
In March 2021, it was announced that a new station building would be built and the number of parking spaces at the station would be increased to 450.

References

External links

 Original Lea Green station at Disused Stations Site

Railway stations in St Helens, Merseyside
DfT Category E stations
Railway stations opened by Railtrack
Railway stations in Great Britain opened in 2000
Northern franchise railway stations
Railway stations served by TransPennine Express